"Christmas in Fallujah" is a single written by Billy Joel and performed by Cass Dillon.  A couple of weeks after they recorded it in a studio, Billy Joel introduced Cass Dillon on stage, in Chicago, for a first live performance of the song. It is also Billy Joel's second new song of original material with lyrics he had written since 1993's River of Dreams.

The single was released on December 4, 2007 exclusively from the iTunes Store and was included on Dillon's EP A Good Thing Never Dies (iTunes download). The proceeds from this single were donated to Homes for Our Troops, a nonprofit organization that builds specially adapted homes for American service members returning from Iraq (Fallujah is a city in Iraq) and Afghanistan with severe disabilities.

"Christmas in Fallujah" was the second single released in 2007 by Joel, who aside from "All My Life" had not released a song with lyrics since 1993. Joel performed "Christmas in Fallujah" live in Australia in November 2008, marking the first time he sang the lyrics to the song instead of Dillon. On December 11, 2008, Joel announced that a new recording of the song that day at Sydney's Acer Arena concert would be released as a download and CD single in honor of the American and Australian soldiers serving in the Middle East. This is the only official recording of Joel singing "Christmas in Fallujah" that is available.

Charts

References

External links
 Homes for Our Troops (official site)

Songs of the Iraq War
2007 singles
2008 singles
Billy Joel songs
American Christmas songs
Christmas charity singles
Fallujah
Live singles
Songs written by Billy Joel
2007 songs